John Musgrove (28 July 1861 – 9 June 1940) was an Australian cricketer. He played in three first-class matches for South Australia in 1887/88.

See also
 List of South Australian representative cricketers

References

External links
 

1861 births
1940 deaths
Australian cricketers
South Australia cricketers
Cricketers from Adelaide